Dreamscape Immersive is an American entertainment and technology company. It creates story-based full-roam virtual reality (VR) experiences which allow up to six people to simultaneously explore a virtual 3D environment, seeing fully rendered avatars of one another. Using real-time motion capture technology, full body mapping, virtual reality headsets, and real-life room-scale stage sets, it enables users to move untethered in a virtual environment and interact with physical objects. The technology was created by Caecilia Charbonnier and Sylvain Chagué, and developed by engineers at Artanim, a Swiss research center specialized in motion-capture technologies.

History

Dreamscape Immersive was co-founded by Walter Parkes, a film producer, Kevin Wall, a global live events producer, investor, and entrepreneur, Caecilia Charbonnier and Sylvain Chagué, co-founders of Artanim, and Ronald Menzel, an entrepreneur.

The company was launched in mid-2016, whereupon Bruce Vaughn, the former head of Disney's Imagineering, was appointed CEO and Aaron Grosky, former president of Control Room, was appointed COO.  It operated in stealth mode until February of the following year. Based in Culver City, California, its first investors included IMAX, Westfield Malls, three film studios, and Steven Spielberg.
AMC Theatres, Nickelodeon and Majid Al Futtaim later invested in the company.

Dreamscape Immersive's first VR installation, Alien Zoo, opened at the Atrium at the Westfield Century City mall in Los Angeles in February 2018. It was followed by The Blu: Deep Rescue, developed in partnership with TheBlu, and Curse of the Lost Pearl: A Magic Projector Adventure. DreamWorks' Dragons Flight Academy VR was released in December of 2019. A Men in Black VR experience was announced in June 2019 and released in 2021.

The second permanent Dreamscape Immersive studio opened in Dallas in August 2019, though closing in January of 2023. Dreamscape Immersive currently operates three locations in the United States, and one each in the United Arab Emirates, Saudi Arabia, and Geneva, Switzerland.

References

External links

Virtual reality companies
Technology companies based in Greater Los Angeles
Entertainment companies based in California
Entertainment companies established in 2016
Technology companies established in 2016
American companies established in 2016
2016 establishments in California
Immersive entertainment